Oh boy, oh boy, oh boy! is a song written by Lasse Dahlquist, and released as a recorded song in 1946. The song has also been recorded by Alf Robertsson and Charlie Norman.

The song, which depicts a British Navy visit to Gothenburg, has become a standard sing-along song in Sweden.

References 

1946 songs
Songs written by Lasse Dahlquist
Swedish songs
Swedish-language songs
Songs about Gothenburg